Muskegon, Michigan is a city in the United States.

Muskegon may also refer to:
 Muskegon, Mississippi
 Muskegon County, Michigan
 Muskegon Lumberjacks
 Muskegon River
 Muskegon High School
 Muskegon County Airport